The discography of Far East Movement, an American electronic pop rap group, consists of five studio albums, four extended plays, five mixtapes, thirty-six singles (including eight as featured artists) and thirty-nine music videos (including four as featured artists). The group formed in 2003 in Los Angeles and released their first mixtape, Audio-Bio, in 2005, with their first studio album Folk Music following in 2006. One of the songs from Folk Music, "Round Round", brought the group their first major exposure after its use in the film The Fast and the Furious: Tokyo Drift. The release of their second studio album, Animal, brought the group to the attention to the Interscope Records subsidiary Cherrytree Records, who signed them.

In 2010, Far East Movement found commercial success with the single "Like a G6", which features singer Dev and producers The Cataracs. It topped the US Billboard Hot 100, later being certified quadruple platinum by the Recording Industry Association of America (RIAA), and reached the top ten of several other national charts, including number one in New Zealand. Its parent album, Free Wired, peaked at number 24 on the US Billboard 200, and featured four further singles: "Rocketeer", which reached number seven on the Billboard Hot 100, "2 Is Better", "2gether" and "If I Was You (OMG)".

Their following album, Dirty Bass, failed to match the commercial success of its predecessor, only reaching number 190 on the Billboard 200, although the first single, "Live My Life" – a collaboration with singer Justin Bieber – reached the top ten of the Swiss and United Kingdom singles charts, and "Turn Up the Love" reached the top ten in Australia and New Zealand. Two other singles from Dirty Bass, "For All" and "Change Your Life", achieved little success of major music charts. Far East Movement found commercial success in 2013 after appearing on "Get Up (Rattle)" by Dutch music producers Bingo Players, which became their first song to top the UK Singles Chart.

Albums

Studio albums

Mixtapes

Extended plays

Singles

As lead artist

As featured artist

Guest appearances

Music videos

As lead artist

As featured artist

Notes

References

External links 
 Official website
 Far East Movement at AllMusic
 
 

Pop music group discographies
Discography